The 1981–82 Western Kentucky Hilltoppers men's basketball team represented Western Kentucky University during the 1981–82 NCAA Division I men's basketball season. The Hilltoppers were led by coach Clem Haskins and All-Ohio Valley Conference center Craig McCormick. In what would be their last year in the conference, WKU won the OVC championship, were OVC tournament runners-up, and received a bid to the 1982 National Invitation Tournament. Bobby Jones joined McCormick on the All-OVC Team; Jones and Kenny Ellis made the OVC Tournament Team and McCormick was tournament MVP. McCormick was selected in the NBA draft following the season.

Schedule

|-
!colspan=6| Regular season

|-

 

|-
!colspan=6| 1982 Ohio Valley Conference Men's Basketball Tournament

|-
!colspan=6| 1982 National Invitation Tournament

References

Western Kentucky Hilltoppers basketball seasons
Western Kentucky
Western Kentucky
Western Kentucky Basketball, Men's
Western Kentucky Basketball, Men's